You Light Up My Life: Inspirational Songs, or simply You Light Up My Life, is the second studio album by the American country singer LeAnn Rimes. Released in the United States by Curb Records on September 9, 1997, when Rimes was 15 years old, it followed her debut album Blue. The album was hugely successful but many critics thought that much of the material did not do Rimes' talent justice. The album has been certified 4× Platinum by the RIAA. She was the first solo artist to chart on the Billboard 200 twice, and fourth overall under the age of 18.

Singles
Two singles were released from the album. The first one, "You Light Up My Life", peaked at number 34 and was certified gold in the United States. The second and final single released from the album is "On the Side of Angels" which peaked at number 4 on the US Country Chart.

Track listing

Personnel 
Credits adapted from You Light Up My Life: Inspirational Songs liner notes.

 LeAnn Rimes – lead vocals
 Kelly Glenn – keyboards
 Jimmy Kelly – keyboards
 Steve Nathan – keyboards
 Jerry Matheny – electric guitars
 John Willis – electric guitars
 Milo Deering – acoustic guitars, steel guitar, fiddle
 Michael Spriggs – acoustic guitars 
 Paul Franklin – steel guitar
 Bob Gentry – bass
 Curtis Randall – bass, backing vocals 
 Michael Rhodes – bass
 Fred Gleber – drums
 Greg Morrow – drums
 Dan Wojciechowski — drums
 Michael Black – backing vocals
 Mary Ann Kennedy – backing vocals
 Gary Leach – backing vocals 
 Pam Rose – backing vocals
 Dennis Willson – backing vocals

Production 
 Wilbur C. Rimes – producer, management 
 Mike Curb – producer (1, 10)
 Chuck Howard – producer (1, 10)
 Greg Hunt – recording, mixing
 Mike McClain – recording, mixing
 Bob Campbell-Smith – additional recording, BGV recording, mixing (1, 10, 11)
 Csaba Pectoz – overdub engineer 
 Mick Guzauski – mixing (10)
 Scott Ahaus – additional recording, recording assistant, assistant overdub engineer, mix assistant (10)
 David Boyer – additional recording, recording assistant 
 Daniel Kresco – additional recording, recording assistant, assistant overdub engineer 
 Gary Leach – recording assistant, mix assistant
 Jim Rogers – additional recording, recording assistant 
 Jeff Watkins – additional recording, recording assistant, BGV recording assistant 
 David Hall – assistant overdub engineer 
 Glenn Meadows – mastering at Masterfonics (Nashville, Tennessee)
 Lesley Albert – project coordinator
 Sue Austin – album design coordinator 
 Frank Lucero – art direction, design 
 Neuman, Walker & Associates, Inc. – art direction, design  
 John Chiasson – photography 
 Lyle Walker – management

Charts and certifications
You Light Up My Life: Inspirational Songs debuted at number one on Billboard 200 with 186,000 copies sold in its first week, the album dropped to number two in its second week but with a 10% increase with sales of 204,500. It returned to number one in its sixth week with 131,500 copies sold. The album spent 13 weeks in the top 5, 17 weeks in the top 10 and a total of 55 weeks in Billboard 200. You Light Up My Life: Inspirational Songs was certified 4× Platinum by RIAA, denoting shipments of over 4 million copies. It is the only album in history to debut at number one on three separate charts at the same time, the three charts being the Billboard 200, the Billboard Top Country Albums, and the Billboard Contemporary Christian.

Weekly charts

Decade-end chart

Year-end charts

Sales

References 

1997 albums
Curb Records albums
LeAnn Rimes albums
Albums produced by Mike Curb